Paraschiva Patulea was a female former international table tennis player from Romania.

Table tennis career
She won a gold medal in the team event at the 1951 World Table Tennis Championships.

See also
 List of table tennis players
 List of World Table Tennis Championships medalists

References

Romanian female table tennis players
World Table Tennis Championships medalists